In the 1936 Wimbledon Championships men's singles competition, Fred Perry successfully defended his title, defeating Gottfried von Cramm in the final, 6–1, 6–1, 6–0 to win the gentlemen's singles title. Perry's victory was the last Wimbledon singles title won by a British male until Andy Murray won in 2013.

Progress of the competition
Perry was on the verge of turning professional, and his decision to compete in the Wimbledon singles first was a risky one because losing would have made him less attractive to the professional ranks, whilst winning would ensure financially beneficial offers. His semifinal against Don Budge was a much harder match than the final against second-seeded Gottfried von Cramm, who sustained an injury during the match but insisted on seeing it through to the conclusion.

The second-best British player, number 7 seed Henry "Bunny" Austin, who was already thirty, was defeated by von Cramm in the semifinals, but two years later he would go on to be the last Briton to contest a Men's Singles final before Andy Murray did so in 2012

Seeds

  Fred Perry (champion)
  Gottfried von Cramm (final)
  Adrian Quist (quarterfinals)
  Wilmer Allison (quarterfinals)
  Don Budge (semifinals)
  Jack Crawford (quarterfinals)
  Bunny Austin (semifinals)
  Bryan Grant (quarterfinals)

Draw

Finals

Top half

Section 1

Section 2

Section 3

Section 4

Bottom half

Section 5

Section 6

Section 7

Section 8

References

External links

Men's Singles
Wimbledon Championship by year – Men's singles